Arprinocid is a coccidiostat (or more likely a coccidiocide, i.e. a drug killing Coccidia parasites) used in veterinary medicine.

Synthesis

References 

Antiparasitic agents
Purines
Chlorobenzenes
Fluoroarenes